Gbenga Adeboye (30 September 1959 – 30 April 2003) was a Nigerian singer, comedian, radio presenter and master of ceremony. Adeboye, broadcaster, comedian and musician, popularly known as ‘Funwontan’, until his death was popular in the Yoruba entertainment industry.

Early life
Elijah Oluwagbemiga Adeboye was born on 30 September 1959 at Odeomu, Osun State, southwestern Nigeria. West Africa

Career
Adeboye was a chief host of a popular radio program presented in Lagos State Broadcasting Corporation in the early 1980s where he got the household name Funwontan Oduology. Gbenga adeboye was described as a generous comedian by a veteran Nigerian actress, Idowu Philips whose first car was a gift from the comedian. He was also described as merchant and performer of traditional Oduology by his fans before he died of kidney-related diseases caused by a food poisoned by his wife Lara Adeboye on 30 April 2003.

See also
Yinka Ayefele - performed a tribute to Adeboye.

References

1959 births
2003 deaths
Nigerian male comedians
People from Osun State
Yoruba comedians
20th-century Nigerian male singers
Yoruba radio personalities
Nigerian radio presenters
Deaths from kidney disease
20th-century comedians